Jacob Leyssens or Jacob Lyssens (nickname Notenkraker)  (1661, Antwerp - 1710, Antwerp), was a Flemish painter and decorator.  After training in Antwerp, he spent a long time in Rome.   After his return to Antwerp, he was active as a painter and decorator and collaborated with prominent Antwerp still life painters such as Gaspar Peeter Verbruggen the Younger and Jan Baptist Bosschaert.

Life
He was born in Antwerp in 1661 as the son of Jacobus and Anthonetta Sas.   He was registered as a pupil of Peter Ykens in the Antwerp Guild of Saint Luke in 1674.  He travelled to Rome at a young age as he is mentioned there in 1680. He became a member of the Bentvueghels, an association of mainly Dutch and Flemish artists working in Rome, with the nickname ‘Notenkraker’ (Nutcracker). He was probably one of the youngest Bentvueghels ever admitted.

The difficult financial situation of his father caused him to return to Antwerp in 1689. He was admitted as a 'wijnmeester' (wine master) to the Antwerp Guild of Saint Luke in the guild year 1698-1699. As this is a title reserved for the sons of members of the Guild, it demonstrates that his father was or had been also a member of the Guild. In the year in which he became a master he also recceived Jan Baptist Bellenraet as a pupil.

He was active in Antwerp as a painter and decorator in the period 1698–1710. He made a will on 31 January 1706 as he was ill.  He lived at the time with his father in Hopland in Antwerp.

Work
Only a few of his works are known, one of which is in the collection of the Hermitage Museum in Saint Petersburg. He decorated many rooms and ceilings in prominent residences and buildings in Antwerp. He is known to have collaborated as a staffage painter with other artists such as Jan Baptist Bosschaert and Gaspar Peeter Verbruggen the Younger, who painted the flowers and fruits.

The early Dutch biographer Jacob Campo Weyerman referred to Jacob Leyssens as a history painter, which indicates that he painted in this genre. A religious painting entitled St. Joseph with the Child Jesus was listed in the inventory on the death of J.J. Moretus and was made over to the city of Antwerp in 1876 when the Plantin-Moretus printing company was sold to the city.

References

External links

Flemish Baroque painters
Flemish history painters
Flemish genre painters
17th-century births
Members of the Bentvueghels
Painters from Antwerp
1710 deaths